Pierre Rioux (born February 1, 1962) is a Canadian former professional ice hockey player who played 14 games in the National Hockey League (NHL) for the Calgary Flames in 1982–83.  Rioux recorded one goal and two assists in his NHL career.

Playing career
Rioux was born in Quebec City, Quebec. As a youth, Rioux played in the 1974 and 1975 Quebec International Pee-Wee Hockey Tournaments with a minor ice hockey team from Quebec City.

Rioux spent three seasons with the Shawinigan Cataractes of the Quebec Major Junior Hockey League, recording 130 points in 1980–81 and 152 points in 1981–82.  In 1982, Rioux was a member of the gold medal-winning Canadian team at the World Junior Hockey Championships.  He was also named a QMJHL First Team All-Star.

As a player with the Flames in 1982, he appeared in 14 games. After three seasons in the minors, Rioux moved to Europe to play in 1986, spent all but one season in Germany until he returned to Quebec in 2000.  Rioux played one season of senior hockey in Quebec in 2000–01 before retiring.

References

External links

1962 births
Augsburger Panther players
Binghamton Whalers players
Calgary Flames players
Colorado Flames players
Düsseldorfer EG players
EV Zug players
French Quebecers
Heilbronner EC players
Ice hockey people from Quebec City
KalPa players
Kassel Huskies players
Krefeld Pinguine players
Living people
Moncton Golden Flames players
Ratingen EC players
Shawinigan Cataractes players
Toronto Maple Leafs scouts
Undrafted National Hockey League players
Canadian ice hockey right wingers
Canadian expatriate ice hockey players in Finland
Canadian expatriate ice hockey players in Germany